Cuterebra cuniculi is a species of new world skin bot fly in the family Oestridae. Its range is restricted to the states of Georgia and Florida. Its larvae are parasites of the eastern cottontail and marsh rabbit.

References

Oestridae
Articles created by Qbugbot
Insects described in 1797